Michitaka Nishiyama (西山 道隆, born January 9, 1980, in Matsuyama, Ehime, Japan) is a Japanese former professional baseball pitcher who played for the Fukuoka SoftBank Hawks of the Nippon Professional Baseball (NPB) from 2006 to 2008.

Career
Prior to playing professionally, he attended Matsuyama Shogyo High School and then Josai University. In 2004, he played for the Winnipeg Goldeyes of the American independent Northern League in 2004, posting a 27.00 ERA in 1/3 of an inning of work. He played for the  Ehime Mandarin Pirates of the Shikoku Island League in 2005 and joined the Hawks for 2006. That year, he had a 10.80 ERA in 3 1/3 innings. The next season, he was 0–2 with a 4.20 ERA in three starts and in 2008, he posted a 21.00 mark in two relief appearances. Overall, he was 0–2 with a 7.59 ERA in 7 games (4 starts) in NPB. In 21 1/3 innings, he had 12 strikeouts, 15 walks and 29 hits allowed.

References

External links
, or NPB

1980 births
Living people
Baseball people from Ehime Prefecture
Josai University alumni
Fukuoka SoftBank Hawks players
Japanese expatriate baseball players in Canada
Nippon Professional Baseball pitchers
People from Matsuyama, Ehime
Winnipeg Goldeyes players